An armistice is a formal agreement of warring parties to stop fighting. It is not necessarily the end of a war, as it may constitute only a cessation of hostilities while an attempt is made to negotiate a lasting peace. It is derived from the Latin arma, meaning "arms" (as in weapons) and -stitium, meaning "a stopping".

The United Nations Security Council often imposes, or tries to impose, cease-fire resolutions on parties in modern conflicts. Armistices are always negotiated between the parties themselves and are thus generally seen as more binding than non-mandatory UN cease-fire resolutions in modern international law.

An armistice is a modus vivendi and is not the same as a peace treaty, which may take months or even years to agree on.  The 1953 Korean War Armistice Agreement is a major example of an armistice which has not been followed by a peace treaty. An armistice is also different from a truce or ceasefire, which refer to a temporary cessation of hostilities for an agreed limited time or within a limited area. A truce may be needed in order to negotiate an armistice.

International law
Under international law, an armistice is a legal agreement (often in a document) that ends fighting between the "belligerent parties" of a war or conflict. At the Hague Convention of 1899, three treaties were agreed and three declarations made. The Convention with respect to the Laws and Customs of War on Land stated, "If [the armistice's] duration is not fixed," the parties may resume fighting (Article 36) as they choose but with proper notifications. That is in comparison to a "fixed duration" armistice in which the parties may renew fighting only at the end of the particular fixed duration. When the belligerent parties say in effect that "this armistice completely ends the fighting" without any end date for the armistice, the duration of the armistice is fixed in the sense that no resumption of the fighting is allowed at any time. For example, the Korean Armistice Agreement calls for a "ceasefire and armistice" and has the "objective of establishing an armistice which will ensure a complete cessation of hostilities and of all acts of armed force in Korea until a final peaceful settlement is achieved."

Armistice Day

Armistice Day (which coincides with Remembrance Day and Veterans Day, public holidays) is commemorated every year on 11 November to mark the Armistice of 11 November 1918 signed between the Allies of World War I and the German Empire at Compiègne, France, for the cessation of hostilities on the Western Front of World War I, which took effect at eleven o'clock in the morning, the "eleventh hour of the eleventh day of the eleventh month" of 1918.

Most countries changed the name of the holiday after World War II to honor veterans of that and subsequent conflicts. Most member states of the Commonwealth of Nations adopted the name Remembrance Day, and the United States chose Veterans Day.

Early modern history
 Armistice of Copenhagen of 1537 ended the Danish war known as the Count's Feud 
 Armistice of Stuhmsdorf of 1635 between the Polish-Lithuanian Commonwealth and Sweden
 Peace of Westphalia of 1648 that ended the Thirty Years' War and Eighty Years' War

20th century

 World War I
 Armistice between Russia and the Central Powers, December 1917
 Armistice of Salonika between Bulgaria and the Allies, September 1918
 Armistice of Mudros between the Ottoman Empire and the Allies, October 1918
 Austrian-Italian Armistice of Villa Giusti ended the fighting of the war on the Italian front in early November 1918
 Armistice with Germany (Compiègne), ended the fighting of the war on the western front, November 11, 1918 
 Armistice of Mudanya between Turkey, Italy, France and the UK and later Greece, 1922
 World War II
 Armistice with France (Second Compiègne), 1940
 Armistice of Saint Jean d'Acre between British forces in the Middle East and Vichy France forces in Syria, 1941
 Armistice with Italy, formal agreement of warring parties, the Allies and Italy, to stop fighting that was signed on 3 September 1943 by Walter Bedell Smith and Giuseppe Castellano.
 Moscow Armistice, signed by Finland and the Soviet Union on 19 September 1944 ending the Continuation War
 1949 Armistice Agreements between Israel and its neighbors Egypt, Jordan, Lebanon and Syria
 Korean War Armistice Agreement, July 1953
 Geneva Agreements signed by France and the Viet Minh on 20 July 1954 ending the First Indochina War
 Évian Armistice in Algeria, 1962, which attempted to end the Algerian War, leading to the Évian Accords.
 Dayton Agreement signed by Bosnia, Croatia and Yugoslavia on 21 November 1995, which ended the Bosnian War

References

External links 

 
The Expanded Cease-Fires Data Set Code Book (Emory University)

 
Military strategy